Babidan (also Romanized as Bābīdān; also known as  Sangdān, Sarbizān, and Sar Bostān) is a village in Gevar Rural District, Sarduiyeh District, Jiroft County, Kerman Province, Iran. At the 2006 census, its population was 109, in 23 families.

References 

Populated places in Jiroft County